Yaygın can refer to:

 Yaygın, Bitlis
 Yaygin, Muş